KBPA (103.5 FM) is a commercial radio station licensed to Austin, Texas. Owned by Sinclair Telecable and operated under the name Waterloo Media, it broadcasts an adult hits radio format.  Its radio studios and offices are located along Interstate 35 in North Austin.

KBPA has an effective radiated power (ERP) of 46,000 watts.  The transmitter is off Mount Larson Road in Austin, sharing the same tower as KTBC.  KBPA broadcasts using HD Radio technology.

History

Good Karma
The station signed on the air June 1, 1971, originally at 103.7 FM as KRMH and was licensed to San Marcos, Texas. "Broadcasting from beautiful downtown Buda" - the station was branded as "Good Karma", airing a progressive rock format.

KRMH was owned by Advance Inc., whose president was R. Miller Hicks. It was one of the few stations to broadcast in quadraphonic stereo.

Shift to Adult contemporary
In 1976, the Pioneer Broadcasting Company of Austin, which also owned KNOW (1490 AM), acquired KRMH and shifted it to an adult contemporary format.  New call letters,  KCSW,  took effect on July 26, 1976. Five years later, the station was acquired by Hicks Communications Inc. of Dallas. Upon closing, the call letters were changed to KEYI and the station was rebranded as Key 103, while keeping the adult contemporary format.

In 1983, the station moved from 103.7 FM to 103.5 FM with a power increase to 100,000 watts. Hicks sold the station to Degree Communications for $15.5 million in 1988. The limited partnership restructured, giving GE Capital control three years later. The transaction amounted to receivership; a year later KEYI was sold for $3 million to San Antonio businessman Van Archer, doing business as Mercury Broadcasting.

Oldies 103
KEYI flipped to oldies music as "Oldies 103" at the beginning of November 1994, in the wake of Austin's oldies station, KFGI-FM, flipping to hot adult contemporary. Two years later, Clear Channel Communications bought KEYI and KFON AM for $3.1 million. Clear Channel attempted to sell KEYI and 44 other stations, in divestiture action spurred by its merger with AMFM, to Hispanic Broadcasting Corporation in a 2000 deal that was scuttled when the United States Department of Justice denied it over equity ties between Clear Channel and HBC.

Clear Channel then sold KEYI to Secret Communications. Secret owned KEYI less than a year before selling it in 2001 to LBJS Broadcasting Company, a partnership of the LBJ Company and Sinclair Telecable (no relation to Sinclair Broadcast Group). LBJ left radio ownership after six decades by selling its majority interest in the partnership to Emmis Communications in 2004, a $105 million purchase. The new partnership was named Emmis Austin Radio Broadcasting Co., LP.

Bob FM
In September 2004, KEYI-FM flipped to adult hits as "Bob FM", changing its call letters to KBPA on September 8.

Sinclair Telecable acquired Emmis's stake in its Austin radio stations in June 2019 for $39.3 million. The FCC approved the transaction, requiring a waiver since it maintained a grandfathered cluster not permissible under current radio ownership rules.

Tower relocation and city of license change
In early 2019, Emmis filed with the Federal Communications Commission for a construction permit to relocate the KBPA transmitter site to Austin from its previous location about 30 miles southwest of Austin.  The power was decreased to 46,000 watts from the previous 100,000 watts.  The station's city of license changed from San Marcos to Austin.

The move was part of a multi-station allocation shuffle led by the Educational Media Foundation allowing EMF to add a signal serving the San Antonio metropolitan area on 103.7 MHz, licensed to Balcones Heights.  The FCC approved the changes in January 2020.  The transmitter relocation and city of license change were completed on March 23, 2021.

References

External links

BPA
Adult hits radio stations in the United States
Bob FM stations
Radio stations established in 1971
1971 establishments in Texas